Free Form is an album by American trumpeter Donald Byrd featuring Byrd with Wayne Shorter, Herbie Hancock, Butch Warren, and Billy Higgins recorded in 1961 and released on the Blue Note label later in 1966. It was remastered in 2003 and reissued on CD. On the CD reissue, the original stereo release is erroneously given as "BST 84106" instead of BST 84118.

Reception
The Allmusic review by Michael G. Nastos awarded the album 4 stars and stated "Free Form is both a smorgasbord of modern jazz styles and a breakthrough album showing the Detroit born trumpeter's versatility and interest in diversity... This may be close to Donald Byrd's best early work, a strong statement that is by no means homogeneous, but expresses many of the avenues in jazz he was exploring while finding his own unique voice on the trumpet".

Track listing
All compositions by Donald Byrd except as indicated

 "Pentecostal Feelin'" - 6:43
 "Night Flower" (Herbie Hancock) - 6:48
 "Nai Nai" - 6:37
 "French Spice" - 8:02
 "Free Form" - 11:11
 "Three Wishes" (Hancock) - 5:12 Bonus track on CD reissue

Personnel
Donald Byrd - trumpet
Wayne Shorter - tenor saxophone
Herbie Hancock - piano
Butch Warren - bass
Billy Higgins - drums

References

1966 albums
Albums produced by Alfred Lion
Albums recorded at Van Gelder Studio
Blue Note Records albums
Donald Byrd albums